Justinas "Justas" Sinica (born 31 May 1985) is a Lithuanian professional basketball player for BC Orchies of the Nationale Masculine 1.

Professional career
On September 15, 2016, Sinica signed with Nevėžis Kėdainiai of Lithuanian Basketball League. On August 27, 2018, Sinica signed with RETAbet Bilbao Basket of the LEB Oro.

References

External links
Justas Sinica at basketnews.lt 

1985 births
Living people
BC Lietkabelis players
BC Nevėžis players
BC Pieno žvaigždės players
BC Prienai players
BC Rytas players
BC Tsmoki-Minsk players
Bilbao Basket players
CB Miraflores players
Lithuanian expatriate basketball people in Spain
Lithuanian men's basketball players
BC Neptūnas players
People from Zarasai
Small forwards